The 1916 Campeonato Carioca, the eleventh edition of that championship, kicked off on May 3, 1916 and ended on December 17, 1916. It was organized by LMSA (Liga Metropolitana de Sports Athleticos, or Metropolitan Athletic Sports League). Seven teams participated. América won the title for the 2nd time. No teams were relegated.

Participating teams

System 
The tournament would be disputed in a double round-robin format, with the team with the most points winning the title. The team with the fewest points would dispute a playoff against the champions of the second level.

Championship

Second-place playoffs 
The regulation also stipulated that the runners-up of the championship would also receive a trophy. Since Bangu and Botafogo tied in points for that position, they had to dispute a playoff.

Relegation playoffs 
The last-placed team, São Cristóvão, would dispute a playoff against Carioca, champions of the Second Level. São Cristóvão won the playoff, but Carioca would be promoted anyway as LMSA folded in early 1917, and the new league formed in its place, LMDT, expanded the championship to ten teams.

References 

Campeonato Carioca seasons
Carioca